Aída Fabiola Valencia Ramírez (born 31 January 1978) is a Mexican politician affiliated with the National Regeneration Movement (formerly to Citizens' Movement). As of 2013 she served as Deputy of the LXII Legislature of the Mexican Congress representing Oaxaca.

References

1978 births
Living people
Politicians from Oaxaca
Women members of the Chamber of Deputies (Mexico)
Citizens' Movement (Mexico) politicians
Morena (political party) politicians
21st-century Mexican politicians
21st-century Mexican women politicians
Deputies of the LXII Legislature of Mexico
Members of the Chamber of Deputies (Mexico) for Oaxaca